Bur Kheyl (also Romanized as Būr Kheyl) is a village in Sharq va Gharb-e Shirgah Rural District, North Savadkuh County, Mazandaran Province, Iran. At the 2006 census, its population was 803, in 230 families.

References 

Populated places in Savadkuh County